Dichostates compactus is a species of beetle in the family Cerambycidae. It was described by Fairmaire in 1887.

Subspecies
 Dichostates compactus compactus Fairmaire, 1887
 Dichostates compactus damarensis Breuning, 1962

References

Crossotini
Beetles described in 1887